The Chinese Ambassador to the Philippines is the official representative of the People's Republic of China to the Philippines.

List of representatives

See also
 China–Philippines relations

References

External links
Official website of the Embassy of the People's Republic of China, Manila

Ambassadors of China to the Philippines
Philippines
China